The Calatayud Ladies Open is a women's professional golf tournament on the LET Access Series, held in Calatayud, Province of Zaragoza, Spain.

The LETAS tournament in Spain moved to Calatayud in 2022 after being held in Murcia in 2010 and 2011, and Costa Blanca in 2014. It draws on the legacy of a Ladies European Tour event held in Marbella in 1988.

Winners

References

External links

LET Access Series events
Former Ladies European Tour events
Golf tournaments in Spain